Lucy McLauchlan (born 1977) is a contemporary artist from England. She is the founder of the Beat13 Collective with artist Matthew Watkins.

Artwork
McLauchlan works on a large scale with print and paint, predominantly in black & white on varied surfaces. 
She continues to paint murals alongside exhibition works.

Her work has appeared in publications including Beyond the Street - The 100 Leading Figures in Urban Art (Gestalten 2010), 1000 Favourite Websites  (Taschen 2003), Hidden Tracks, BLK/MRKT Two (Gestalten 2007),  Hand to Eye, Creative Review, Graphic International, DPM, Graphic Britain, IdN magazine, Modart, Juxtapoz, Relax and Plus81.

In 2001 Beat13 exhibited at the Horse Hospital arts venue in central London and at Filesharing in Berlin. By 2004 she joined Pictures on Walls and exhibited at Santa's Ghetto London (2005-2006) and Bethlehem (2007). Her first solo London show, Expressive Deviant Phonology, ran from December 2007-January 2008, at Lazarides Gallery in Soho.

Lucy McLauchlan was represented by Lazarides since the exhibition Expressive Deviant Phonology in 2007 until early 2018.

In July 2010, she painted three multi-storey birds on Birmingham Central Library. These were lost when the library was subsequently demolished, although a fragment, on a wooden door which was removed prior to demolition, survives.

Solo exhibitions 

2005: Before the Birds Stop Singing, Analogue Gallery, Edinburgh
2007: Expressive Deviant Phonology, Lazarides Rathbone, London
2008: A New Collection of Paintings, Fifty24SF Gallery, San Francisco, US
2009: All Of Us, Rugby Art Gallery & Museum, Rugby
2010: Together ..., Lazarides Rathbone, London
2013: Holding onto Fragments of Past Memories, Triumph Gallery, Moscow
2014: Marking Shadows, Lazarides Rathbone, London
2015: Where Were You Before Now, Fluorescent Smogg Project Space, Barcelona
2018: There Are Voices To Be Heard, Nelson City, New Zealand

Collections 

McLauchlan's work is held in the following permanent public collections:
Victoria and Albert Museum, London
Birmingham Museum and Art Gallery, Birmingham
British Government Art Collection, Rome
Urban Nation Museum, Berlin
Library of Birmingham, UK

Referencing

External links 

Lucy McLauchlan on Lazinc

1977 births
Living people
21st-century British women artists
Artists from Birmingham, West Midlands